Veer Surendra Sai University of Technology, formerly known as the University College of Engineering, Burla, is a state university located in Burla, Sambalpur, Odisha, India. Established in 1956, it is the oldest engineering college in Odisha. UCE Burla, its former name, was officially changed to its current name on 10 June 2009, as a result of a resolution by the Government of Odisha to accord it with the status of a unitary university.

The university was declared eligible to receive central assistance under Section 12B of the UGC Act in 2012.

History 
Veer Surendra Sai University of Technology was initially founded as University College of Engineering(UCE), Burla, under the direction of the Government of Odisha, as the first engineering college of the state, in 1956. The primary purpose of the college was to supplement white collar workers, in the form of electrical, civil, and mechanical engineers, to the nearby Hirakud Dam project. The foundation for the college was laid by the first Prime Minister of the country, Jawaharlal Nehru. The first batch  contained 20 students, consisting of 3 branches, namely Civil Engineering, Electrical Engineering and Mechanical Engineering.
The University later passed on to the administrative control of the Sambalpur University, and then under the control of the Biju Patnaik University of Technology. In 2008, the students of UCE actively campaigned for due recognition as an independent university, culminating in the university being founded in 2009.

Programmes offered 
 Bachelor of Technology (B.Tech)
 Bachelor of Architecture (B.Arch)
 Master of Technology(M.Tech)
 Master of Science(M.Sc.)
 Master of Philosophy (M.Phil)
 Master in Computer Application(MCA)
 Doctor of Philosophy(Ph.D.)

Notable alumni

Campus 
The university, located close to the Hirakud Dam, occupies about 350 acres in Burla. Facilities in laboratories of various departments and central facilities such as Computer Centre, Library, Internet Centre and Central Workshop, separate hostels for boys and girls, conference hall, recreational amenities and other utility services are available for the students in the campus. Government of Odisha also decided to extend the campus to another 80 acre and also approved a mass amount of ₹2000 crore for the development of VSSUT.

Halls of Residence 
The university provides on-campus residential facilities to its students, research scholars, faculty members and many of its staff. The students live in hostels (referred to as halls of residence) throughout their stay in the campus. Hostel rooms are wired for internet, for which students pay a compulsory charge. There are 11 halls of residences including 5 for girls and 6 for boys.

 Marichi Hall of Residence
 Atri Hall of Residence
 Kratu Hall of Residence
 Arundhati Hall of Residence
 Anuradha Hall of Residence
 Vasistha Hall of Residence
 Visakha Hall of Residence
 Angira Hall of Residence
 Pulastya Hall of Residence
 Rohini Hall of Residence
 Vasundhara Hall of Residence
 Pulaha Hall of Residence

Achievements 
 AIR-1 in Design, Go-green and CAE event at BAJA-SAE India 2020 at Punjab
 AIR-1 in Dirt-X and Endurance event at Enduro Student India 2017 at Coimbatore by BAJA-SAE team.
 AIR-3 in MATLAB Innovation for ROBOCON-2018 
 AIR-2 in EYANTRA Robotic Competition conducted by IIT, Bombay & MHRD 
 SAE Team secured 3rd in the Cost Presentation Event and 4th in Design Evaluation Event at FFS INDIA 2k19, Coimbatore. They even secured an overall rank of 7th in the complete event.
 Winners at India Innovation Growth Programme (IIGP 2.0) organised TATA Trust & DST 
Student satellite program in Limca book of records.
The student satellite Team was called on by the Prime Minister, Mr Narendra Modi in his monthly radio address, Mann ki Baat, for their resounding success in developing fully functional prototypes of satellite launch vehicles.
 Winners of University Challenge, IIGP 2018(Indian Innovation Growth Programme) 2.0, Government of India.

Rankings 

The National Institutional Ranking Framework has accorded it a rank of 119 in engineering institutions

See also
 Veer Surendra Sai Institute of Medical Sciences and Research
 IIT Bhubaneswar
 NIT Rourkela

References

External links
 

Universities and colleges in Sambalpur
Universities in Odisha
Engineering colleges in Odisha
All India Council for Technical Education
1956 establishments in Orissa
Educational institutions established in 1956